The Favoritner Athletik Club, or FavAC for short, is an Austrian football club from the Viennese Favoriten district and currently plays under the sponsored name Cashpoint FavAC in the fourth tier, the Viennese City League. The club's popularity drastically rose during their two-year spell in the top division between 1983 and 1985. Their colours are red and black.

It should not be confused with Favoritner Sports Club, a club that was active in the highest Austrian league several years before, nor with Favoritner SK Blau-Weiß which also played in the top division.

History 
The club was founded in 1910 as the football section of the bowling club Kegelklub Favorit as Favorit Athletic Club. On 21 December 1910 the club was admitted to a meeting of the Austrian Football Association and assigned to the Vienna Second Division. Before that, the club was already entered into the register of associations on 1 August 1910, under the name Favoritner Athletics Sports Club, or Favoritner ASC for short. After a few years in 2nd Division and a temporary spell in the league of the labour movement, the VAFÖ (Vereinigung der Amateur-Fußballvereine Österreichs), Favoritner AC played in the years 1936 to 1938 for the first time in the highest Austrian league.

After the relegation in 1938, the top flight could only be achieved between 1983 and 1985. However these two seasons brought the FavAC a great popularity in Vienna.

Since 2010/11 the club plays in Wiener Stadtliga, the fourth-highest tier.

Honours

Women

Austrian Women's Champions: 1972/73

Men

2 × Vienna City League Winners: 1977, 1981
2 × semi-finalists of the Austrian Cup : 1992, 1993
1 × Winner of the Wiener Stadthalle Tournament : 1993

Other achievements:

1934/35: Promotion to the State League
1935–1938: Granted State League membership
1950/51: Winners of the National League
1948–49: 2nd Division North Winners 
1976/77: Wiener Stadtliga Winners
1977/78: Promotion to the 2nd Bundesliga
1982/83: Promotion to the 1st Bundesliga
1983/84: relegation from the Bundesliga
1994/95: Regionalliga Ost Winners
1995: 6th in the 2nd Bundesliga

Notable players
Player who have played in a top flight league:
 Zoran Barišić
 Peter Burgstaller
 Dietmar Constantini
 Reinhard Kienast
 Tomislav Kocijan
 Mario Majstorović
 Andreas Ogris
 Hans Pirkner
 Josef Sara
 Robert Sara
 Fred Schaub
 Peter Stöger
 Gerhard Bronner (as a youth player)
 Stevica Zdravković

External links
  Official website

Association football clubs established in 1910
Football clubs in Vienna
Football clubs in Austria
1910 establishments in Austria-Hungary
Establishments in the Empire of Austria (1867–1918)